Daniel Oliver "Dan" Brand (August 4, 1935 – February 10, 2015) was an American wrestler. He attended the University of Nebraska-Lincoln, where he was an All-America selection in 1958.

Brand won a bronze medal in freestyle wrestling (middleweight class) at the 1964 Summer Olympics, which were held in Tokyo. On the way to his medal, he defeated Theuni Van Wyk of the Netherlands, Tasuo Sasaki of Japan, and Faiz Muhammad of Pakistan. He lost his final match to Hasan Güngör of Turkey, who won the silver medal. Before the 1964 Olympics, Brand had won four straight titles in freewrestling at the Amateur Athletic Union National Championships, along with three straight titles in Greco-Roman wrestling.

Brand participated in the 1960 Summer Olympics at Rome, but placed fifth in his class and did not earn a medal. He died in February 2015, at the age of 79.

Notes

External links
 

1935 births
2015 deaths
Olympic bronze medalists for the United States in wrestling
Wrestlers at the 1960 Summer Olympics
Wrestlers at the 1964 Summer Olympics
American male sport wrestlers
University of Nebraska–Lincoln alumni
Medalists at the 1964 Summer Olympics
People from Bellevue, Nebraska
People from Sarpy County, Nebraska
20th-century American people